Brad Alan Fichtel (born March 10, 1970) is a former American football center who played for the Los Angeles Rams of the National Football League (NFL). He played college football at Eastern Illinois University and was inducted into the school's Hall of Fame in 2014.

He was drafted to the Los Angeles Rams in 1993 and was on the team for two years. He played one game in his career, a week ten victory over the Denver Broncos in 1994. He attended football camp for the Washington Redskins in 1995, and almost joined the Dallas Cowboys in 1996, but failed a physical.

Since then he became a physical education teacher in Heath, Texas, and was a finalist for NFL Teacher of the Year in 2012. He got his Master of Science in Education at Canisius College in 2016. In 2018, he transitioned to the Rockwall Independent School District.

Fichtel is married to Suzanne, a former assistant district attorney in Rockwall, Texas. They have three sons. one who is following in his father’s footsteps continuing his football career at Eastern Illinois

References

Further reading
  

Living people
1970 births
American football centers
Eastern Illinois Panthers football players
Los Angeles Rams players
Players of American football from Illinois
Eastern Illinois University alumni